Yulema Corres (born 7 March 1992) is a Spanish football forward who plays for Athletic Club of Spain's Primera División.

Career
Corres signed with the Athletic after having scored 29 goals with the Aurrera Vitoria the previous season (top-scorer of Second División. group 2).

Honours

Club
 Athletic Bilbao
 Primera División: 2015–16

References

External links
 
 
 Yulema Corres at La Liga (archived) 
 
 
 

1992 births
Living people
Spanish women's footballers
Footballers from Vitoria-Gasteiz
Primera División (women) players
Athletic Club Femenino players
Women's association football forwards
21st-century Spanish women